Karim Huseyn oglu Mammadbeyov (27 March 1899 – 7 September 1938) was a Soviet Dagestani politician, social activist and revolutionary who participated in the Bolshevik movement in Dagestan and served in various government positions from 1921 to 1937.

Early life
Karim Mammadbeyov was born in the village of Yersi in the historical region of Tabasaran to an ethnic Azeri family of Mammad Huseyn Mammadbeyov, an office clerk, and his wife Seyid-Qayabika.

In 1915, while attending a Realschule in Derbent, Karim Mammadbeyov began attending revolutionary lectures and joined the Communist Party (at the time called the Russian Social Democratic Workers' Party) in April 1917. In September 1917, he commenced his undergraduate studies at the University of Kazan, but the events following the October Revolution forced him to go back to Dagestan in early 1918. He actively participated in the events held by the Hummat party. After the British occupation of Dagestani ports, Mammadbeyov was delegated to Astrakhan to work with local Muslim labourers. He participated in active fighting in Dagestan until February 1919, when his was disbanded to due heavy losses to typhus. He received the Order of the Red Banner in 1922.

Political career
After the establishment of the Soviet power in the North Caucasus, Mammadbeyov was appointed head of the Dagestani Extraordinary Commission (Cheka) and well as People's Commissar (Minister) of Internal Affairs of Dagestan. In the next nine years, he served as Dagestan's People's Commissar of Finance and Head of the Dagestan Regional Branch of the State Political Directorate. In 1931, he was elected Chair of the Council of People's Commissars of Dagestan and served in that position until 1937.

While serving in that position, Mammadbeyov effectively suppressed anti-Soviet movements in Chechnya and Dagestan and trained native Dagestanis in civil service, which experienced severe shortage in local cadres. During his term, the first medical, pedagogical and agricultural speciality schools, the Kumyk national theatre, the Dagestan Song and Dance Ensemble, the Folk Instruments Orchestra of Dagestan and the Writers' Union of Dagestan were established.

On 27 September 1937, in the midst of the Stalinist purges, Mammadbeyov was removed from his position, expelled from the Communist Party and arrested as an "enemy of state" based on false allegations, accused of being an accomplice to "bourgeois nationalists". He was not shown the arrest warrant until his third month in custody and the case protocol was completed only five and a half months later. Mammadbeyov was executed by firing squad on 7 September 1938 in Moscow.

Personal life
From 1925, he was to married Lyubov Erlich, a fellow revolutionary and participant of the Russian Civil War in Dagestan. She was arrested together with her husband and sentenced to eight years in labour camps allegedly for supporting Trotskyism. Their son Harun was arrested in 1938, but acquitted soon afterward. He fought in the Great Patriotic War as a volunteer and died in the Battle of Moscow in 1941. Erlich-Mammadbeyova was released in 1948, having served her sentence, and died in 1988 in Moscow.

References

Dagestani politicians
1899 births
1938 deaths
Azerbaijani people of Dagestani descent
Soviet Azerbaijani people
Great Purge victims from Russia
Executed Azerbaijani people